The index of physics articles is split into multiple pages due to its size.

To navigate by individual letter use the table of contents below.

S

S-1 Uranium Committee
S-LINK
S-PRISM
S-brane
S-duality
S-knot
S-matrix
S-matrix theory
S-process
S-wave
S. Brooks McLane
S. Pancharatnam
SAFARI-1
SAGE (Soviet–American Gallium Experiment)
SAM1
SAM 935
SAT Subject Test in Physics
SDSSJ0946+1006
SDSS J0927+2943
SED Systems
SELFOC Microlens
SETAR (model)
SHEEP (symbolic computation system)
SIESTA (computer program)
SIMP
SIMPLE (dark matter)
SIMPLE algorithm
SINDO
SI electromagnetism units
SLAC
SLAC (disambiguation)
SLAC National Accelerator Laboratory
SLOWPOKE reactor
SMART-1
SNO+
SNOLAB
SNUPPS
SN 1006
SN 1987A
SN 2002cx
SN 2003fg
SN 2005gj
SN 2007bi
SO(10) (physics)
SOFAR channel
SOLEIL
SPEAR
SPEED2000
SPIE
SPIN bibliographic database
SPring-8
SQUID
SS Charles H. Cugle
STACEE
STAR detector
STAR model
STATCOM
STEP (satellite)
SU(5)
SUNIST
SUVAT equations
SWEEPNIK
SYZ conjecture
S band
Sabba S. Ştefănescu
Sabin (unit)
Sacharias Jansen
Sachs–Wolfe effect
Sackur–Tetrode equation
Safety of particle collisions at the Large Hadron Collider
Saffir–Simpson Hurricane Scale
Sagitta (optics)
Sagnac effect
Saha ionization equation
Sailing faster than the wind
Saint-Laurent-des-Eaux
Saint Anthony Falls Laboratory
Sajeev John
Sakurai Prize
Sally Ride
Salomon Kalischer
Salter's duck
Sam Edwards (physicist)
Sam Treiman
Samar Mubarakmand
Samarium–cobalt magnet
Sameera Moussa
Samson Kutateladze
Samuel C. C. Ting
Samuel Collins (physicist)
Samuel Curran
Samuel Devons
Samuel E. Blum
Samuel Goudsmit
Samuel Jackson Barnett
Samuel King Allison
Samuel L. Braunstein
Samuel Milner
Samuel T. Cohen
Samuel T. Durrance
Samuel Tolansky
Samuel Tolver Preston
Sandip Chakrabarti
Sandip Trivedi
Sankar Das Sarma
Sarah Frances Whiting
Sarfus
Saskatchewan Accelerator Laboratory
Saskatoon experiment
Satellite flare
Satellite laser ranging
Satish Dhawan
Satoshi Kawata
Satosi Watanabe
Saturable absorption
Saturation (magnetic)
Saturation vapor curve
Saturation vapor pressure
Satyendra Nath Bose
Sauerbrey equation
Saul Dushman
Saul Perlmutter
Saul Rappaport
Saul Teukolsky
Sauter mean diameter
Savart wheel
Savas Dimopoulos
Savonius wind turbine
Saybolt universal second
Scalar–tensor theory
Scalar–vector–tensor decomposition
Scalar (physics)
Scalar Field Dark Matter
Scalar boson
Scalar electrodynamics
Scalar field (quantum field theory)
Scalar field dark matter
Scalar field solution
Scalar field theory
Scalar meson
Scalar multiplication
Scalar potential
Scalar theories of gravitation
Scalar–tensor–vector gravity
Scale-free ideal gas
Scale factor (cosmology)
Scale invariance
Scale relativity
Scaling limit
Scanning Acoustic Tomography
Scanning SQUID microscope
Scanning acoustic microscope
Scanning capacitance microscopy
Scanning probe microscopy
Scanning transmission electron microscopy
Scanning tunneling microscope
Scattering
Scattering-matrix method
Scattering (optics)
Scattering channel
Scattering cross-section
Scattering from rough surfaces
Scattering length
Scattering rate
Scattering theory
Sceptre (fusion reactor)
Schaefer–Bergmann diffraction
Scharnhorst effect
Scherk–Schwarz mechanism
Schiehallion experiment
Schlieren
Schlieren imaging
Schlieren photography
Schmidt corrector plate
Schmidt number
School of Physics and Astronomy, University of Manchester
Schottky anomaly
Schottky defect
Schrödinger's Kittens and the Search for Reality
Schrödinger's cat
Schrödinger's cat in popular culture
Schrödinger equation
Schrödinger picture
Schrödinger–Newton equation
Schumann resonances
Schuyler Wheeler
Schwarzschild coordinates
Schwarzschild criterion
Schwarzschild geodesics
Schwarzschild metric
Schwarzschild radius
Schwinger's quantum action principle
Schwinger function
Schwinger limit
Schwinger model
Schwinger parametrization
Schwinger–Dyson equation
Schön scandal
SciBooNE
Science Abstracts
Science and Technology of Advanced Materials
Scientific equipment optician
Scintillation (physics)
Scintillation counter
Scintillator
Scleronomous
Scott Anderson (physicist)
Scott Diddams
Scott Forbush
Screened Poisson equation
Screw (motion)
Screw axis
Screw pump
Screw theory
Scripta Materialia
Sea breeze
Sea state
Sean Cadogan
Sean M. Carroll
Search for the Higgs boson
Searle's bar method
Sears–Haack body
Seashell resonance
Sebastian Doniach
Sebastian Seung
Sebastian von Hoerner
Second-harmonic generation
Second-order fluid
Second-order transition
Second Industrial Revolution
Second class constraints
Second law of thermodynamics
Second moment of area
Second sound
Second superstring revolution
Secondary circulation
Secondary electrons
Secondary emission
Secondary flow
Secondary ion mass spectrometry
Secondary mirror
Sectional density
Sector instrument
Secular equilibrium
Sedan (nuclear test)
Sediment transport
Sedimentation
Seed crystal
Seed nucleus
Seeding (fluid dynamics)
Seesaw mechanism
Segre classification
Segré–Silberberg effect
Seiberg duality
Seiberg–Witten gauge theory
Seibert Q. Duntley
Seiche
Seifallah Randjbar-Daemi
Seismic metamaterials
Seismic migration
Seismic refraction
Seismic source
Seismic tomography
Seismological Society of America
Selected-ion flow-tube mass spectrometry
Selected area diffraction
Selection rule
Selective adsorption
Selective surface
Self-amplified stimulated emission
Self-averaging
Self-diffusion
Self-energy
Self-focusing transducers
Self-information
Self-interacting dark matter
Self-mixing interferometry
Self-organized criticality
Self-phase modulation
Self-propagating high-temperature synthesis
Sellafield
Sellmeier equation
Semi-empirical mass formula
Semi-empirical quantum chemistry method
Semi-major axis
Semi-minor axis
Semi-rigid airship
Semiclassical gravity
Semiconductor
Semiconductor Science and Technology
Semiconductor characterization techniques
Semiconductor detector
Semiconductor fault diagnostics
Semiconductor ring laser
Semileptonic decay
Semimetal
Semipermeable membrane
Sendai Nuclear Power Plant
Sending loudness rating
Sendust
Sensible heat
Separable state
Separatrix (dynamical systems)
Sequential structure alignment program
Sequential walking
Serge Haroche
Serge Rudaz
Serge Timashev
Sergei Alexander Schelkunoff
Sergei Gukov
Sergei K. Godunov
Sergei Kopeikin
Sergei Kovalev
Sergei Odintsov
Sergei P. Kurdyumov
Sergei Tyablikov
Sergei Vonsovsky
Sergey Chaplygin
Sergey Ivanovich Vavilov
Sergey Kapitsa
Sergey Khristianovich
Sergey M. Bezrukov
Sergey Nikitin (musician)
Sergio Ferrara
Sergiu Rădăuţan
Serguei Krasnikov
Set and drift
Seth Neddermeyer
Severn Barrage
Sextupole magnet
Seymour Benzer
Sfermion
Sgoldstino
Shade (shadow)
Shadowgraph
Shadows of the Mind
Shahn Majid
Shahriar Afshar
Shake (unit)
Shakedown (continuum mechanics)
Shallow donor
Shallow water equations
Shamal (wind)
Shamit Kachru
Shanghai Synchrotron Radiation Facility
Shannon Walker
Shape factor (X-ray diffraction)
Shape factor (boundary layer flow)
Shape of the universe
Shape resonance
Shape waves
Shapiro delay
Sharkovskii's theorem
Shashlik (physics)
Shaukat Hameed Khan
Shawn Carlson
Shear flow
Shear modulus
Shear rate
Shear strain
Shear stress
Shear thinning
Shear velocity
Shearing (physics)
Shearography
Shed (unit)
Sheer thinning
Sheldon Datz
Sheldon Glashow
Shell balance
Shell theorem
Shelter Island Conference
Shen Chun-shan
Shengwang Du
Sherwood number
Shielding effect
Shields parameter
Shigeo Satomura
Shijun Liao
Shim (magnetism)
Shin'ichi Nojiri
Shing-Tung Yau
Shinzo Shinjo
Ship tracks
Shiraz Minwalla
Shirley Ann Jackson
Shirshov Institute of Oceanology
Shiva laser
Shiyi Chen
Shlomo Havlin
Shock (fluid dynamics)
Shock (mechanics)
Shock capturing methods
Shock diamond
Shock metamorphism
Shock stall
Shock tube
Shock wave
Shock waves in astrophysics
Shockley–Queisser limit
Shoe-fitting fluoroscope
Shoichi Sakata
Shor's algorithm
Shortcut model
Shortwave radiation
Shot noise
Shower-curtain effect
Shri Krishna Joshi
Shubnikov–de Haas effect
Shunt impedance
Side-scan sonar
Sidereus Nuncius
Sideslip angle
Sidney Altman
Sidney Coleman
Sidney Dancoff
Sidney Drell
Sidney R. Nagel
Sidney Redner
Siegbahn notation
Siegfried Czapski
Siegfried Flügge
Siegfried Hecker
Siemens (unit)
Siemens cycle
Siemens star
Sievert
Sievert chamber
Sievert integral
Sigma Pi Sigma
Sigma baryon
Sigma model
Sign convention
Signal-to-noise plus interference
Signal-to-noise ratio
Signal beam
Signal velocity
Signature change
Significant wave height
Signorini problem
Sigurd Hofmann
Sigurd Zienau
Silas D. Alben
Silent Aircraft Initiative
Silex
Silex Process
Silicon-germanium
Silicon (journal)
Silicon bandgap temperature sensor
Silicon photomultiplier
Silicon photonics
Silicon transistor
Silly Putty
Silver nanoparticles
Silvo Breskvar
Simon Ostrach
Simon Ramo
Simon Shnoll
Simon van der Meer
Simons Center for Geometry and Physics
Simple harmonic motion
Simple harmonic oscillator
Simple lens
Simple machine
Simple shear
Simplex noise
Simulated fluorescence process algorithm
Simulated reality
Simulation hypothesis
Simultaneous masking
Siméon Denis Poisson
Sin-Itiro Tomonaga
Sine–Gordon equation
Singing arc
Singing sand
Single-molecule magnet
Single-particle spectrum
Single-photon emission computed tomography
Single crystal
Single domain (magnetic)
Single negative metamaterial
Single scattering albedo
Single wavelength anomalous dispersion
Singlet state
Singleton field
Singular isothermal sphere profile
Singularity (Bill DeSmedt novel)
Sinusoidal plane-wave solutions of the electromagnetic wave equation
Sinyan Shen
Siphon
Sir Andrew Noble, 1st Baronet
Sir George Stokes, 1st Baronet
Sir James Hall, 4th Baronet
Sisir Kumar Mitra
Sisyphus cooling
Sisyphus effect
Sivaramakrishna Chandrasekhar
Six's thermometer
Skew-T log-P diagram
Skin depth
Skin effect
Skip distance
Skip reentry
Sky Polarization Observatory
Sky anchor
Sky brightness
Skyrmion
Slack water
Slater-type orbital
Slater determinant
Slater integrals
Slave boson
Slavnov–Taylor identities
Slender-body theory
Sliding (motion)
Sliding friction
Slip (materials science)
Slip (vehicle dynamics)
Slip melting point
Slipstream
Slit experiment
Sloan Digital Sky Survey
Sloan Extension for Galactic Understanding and Exploration 2
Slope efficiency
Slosh dynamics
Slow-motion approximation
Slow light
Slowly varying envelope approximation
Small-angle X-ray scattering
Small-angle neutron scattering
Small-angle scattering
Small Tight Aspect Ratio Tokamak
Small article monitor
Small wind turbine
Smart Fluids
Smart Materials and Structures
Smart fluid
Smart glass
Smart material
Smithsonian Astrophysical Observatory
Smith–Purcell effect
Smoke
Smoke ring
Smoluchowski coagulation equation
Smooth camber change
Smoothed-particle hydrodynamics
Smuon
Smyth Report
Snap freezing
Snell's law
Sneutrino
Soap bubble
Society of Exploration Geophysicists
Society of Physics Students
Sod shock tube
Sodium Reactor Experiment
Soft-collinear effective theory
Soft Matter (journal)
Soft SUSY breaking
Soft X-ray emission spectroscopy
Soft matter
Soft photons
Soft radiation
Softening
Soil physics
Soil plant atmosphere continuum
Soil thermal properties
Sokolov–Ternov effect
Solar Observing Optical Network
Solar Physics (journal)
Solar System model
Solar cosmic ray
Solar energetic particles
Solar energy
Solar flare
Solar mass
Solar neutrino
Solar neutrino problem
Solar neutrino unit
Solar physicist
Solar physics
Solar prominence
Solar radiation pressure
Solar thermal energy
Solar wind
Solarization (physics)
Solarsoft
Solenoid
Solenoidal vector field
Solid
Solid-state ionics
Solid-state laser
Solid-state nuclear magnetic resonance
Solid-state nuclear track detector
Solid-state physics
Solid State Communications
Solid angle
Solid harmonics
Solid hydrogen
Solid mechanics
Solid solution
Solid state dye lasers
Solidus (chemistry)
Soliton
Soliton (optics)
Solomon Saltiel
Solstice
Solution of Schrödinger equation for a step potential
Solutions of the Einstein field equations
Solvated electron
Solvay Conference
Solving the geodesic equations
Somerset Space Walk
Sommerfeld identity
Sommerfeld number
Sommerfeld radiation condition
Sommerfeld–Kossel displacement law
Somnath Bharadwaj
Sonar
Sondrestrom Upper Atmospheric Research Facility
Sone
Sonic black hole
Sonic boom
Sonic cavitation
Sonic weapon
Sonication
Sonobuoy
Sonochemistry
Sonology
Sonoluminescence
Soret Peak
Sorption
Sorptivity
Soudan 1
Soudan 2
Sound
Sound Retrieval System
Sound amplification by stimulated emission of radiation
Sound baffle
Sound barrier
Sound diffuser
Sound energy density
Sound energy flux
Sound from ultrasound
Sound generator
Sound intensity
Sound intensity level
Sound of fingernails scraping chalkboard
Sound power
Sound power level
Sound pressure
Sound reduction index
Sound transmission class
Source counts
Source field
Source function
Southern Hemisphere Auroral Radar Experiment
Soviet Physics Uspekhi
Sołtan argument
Space
Space Weather Prediction Center
Space charge
Space group
Space physics
Spacequake
Spaceship Earth (detector)
Spacetime
Spacetime algebra
Spacetime symmetries
Spacetime topology
Spaghettification
Spalart–Allmaras turbulence model
Spallation
Spallation Neutron Source
Spark (fire)
Spark chamber
Spark gap
Sparticle
Spaser
Spatial cutoff frequency
Spatial filter
Spatial frequency
Spatial twist continuum
Special nuclear material
Special relativity
Special relativity (alternative formulations)
Special sciences
Special sensor microwave/imager
Specific absorption rate
Specific activity
Specific detectivity
Specific energy
Specific force
Specific gravity
Specific impulse
Specific kinetic energy
Specific latent heat of fusion
Specific orbital energy
Specific radiative intensity
Specific relative angular momentum
Specific speed
Specific strength
Specific volume
Specific weight
Speckle noise
Speckle pattern
Spectral bands
Spectral density
Spectral imaging
Spectral line
Spectral mutability
Spectral phase interferometry for direct electric-field reconstruction
Spectral splatter
Spectral triple
Spectrogram
Spectrograph
Spectroradiometer
Spectroscopic notation
Spectroscopy
Specular reflection
Speed
Speed of electricity
Speed of gravity
Speed of light
Speed of revolution
Speed of sound
Spekkens Toy Model
Spencer R. Weart
Spent nuclear fuel
Spenta R. Wadia
Sphaleron
Sphere of influence (astrodynamics)
Sphere packing
Spherical aberration
Spherical cow
Spherical harmonics
Spherical model
Spherical multipole moments
Spherical tokamak
Spherically symmetric spacetime
Spheromak
Spider (polarimeter)
Spin-destruction collision
Spin-flip
Spin-orbital
Spin-polarized electron energy loss spectroscopy
Spin-stabilized magnetic levitation
Spin-statistics theorem
Spin-weighted spherical harmonics
Spin-½
Spin (physics)
Spin Hall effect
Spin Liquid
Spin angular momentum of light
Spin chemistry
Spin connection
Spin crossover
Spin density wave
Spin diffusion
Spin echo
Spin foam
Spin glass
Spin ice
Spin isomers of hydrogen
Spin magnetic moment
Spin model
Spin multiplicity
Spin network
Spin polarization
Spin probe
Spin pumping
Spin quantum number
Spin states (d electrons)
Spin stiffness
Spin tensor
Spin transistor
Spin valve
Spin wave
Spinhenge@Home
Spinodal decomposition
Spinon
Spinor
Spinor bundle
Spinoza Prize
Spinplasmonics
Spinthariscope
Spintronics
Spin–charge separation
Spin–orbit interaction
Spiral computed tomography
Spiral divergence
Spiru Haret
Splash (fluid mechanics)
Split-Hopkinson pressure bar
Split-quaternion
Split-ring resonator
Split supersymmetry
Spoiler (aeronautics)
Spontaneous emission
Spontaneous fission
Spontaneous magnetization
Spontaneous parametric down-conversion
Spontaneous process
Spontaneous symmetry breaking
Sporadic E propagation
Spouting can
Spray nozzle
Spring pendulum
Spring scale
Springboard
Sputtering
Squall
Square-lattice Ising model
Square metre
Squashed entanglement
Squat effect
Squeeze operator
Squeezed coherent state
Srnoluchowski
Stabilator
Stability derivatives
Stable map
Stack effect
Staebler–Wronski effect
Staggered fermion
Stagnation point
Stagnation pressure
Stagnation temperature
Stall (flight)
Stall delay
Stall strips
Stan Frankel
Standard-Model Extension
Standard Dry Air
Standard Model
Standard Model (mathematical formulation)
Standard conditions for temperature and pressure
Standard cubic feet per minute
Standard day
Standard enthalpy of formation
Standard enthalpy of reaction
Standard gravitational parameter
Standard linear solid model
Standard molar entropy
Standard ruler
Standard solar model
Standing wave
Stanford E. Woosley
Stanford Institute for Theoretical Physics
Stanford Large Detector
Stanford Linear Collider
Stanford Physics Information Retrieval System
Stanford Synchrotron Radiation Lightsource
Stanhope lens
Stanislas Sorel
Stanislav Mikheyev
Stanisław Mrozowski
Stanley Autler
Stanley Brodsky
Stanley Deser
Stanley G. Love
Stanley Mandelstam
Stanley S. Ballard
Stanley Schmidt
Stanley Whitehead (physicist)
Stanton T. Friedman
Star
Star formation
Stark effect
Stark spectroscopy
Stark spectroscopy (physics)
Stark–Einstein law
Starling equation
Starting vortex
Startup winding
State-of-the-Art Reactor Consequence Analyses
State-universal coupled cluster
State of matter
Static (radio)
Static bar
Static cling
Static electricity
Static forces and virtual-particle exchange
Static interpretation of time
Static margin
Static pressure
Static spacetime
Static spherically symmetric perfect fluid
Static universe
Statics
Stationary phase approximation
Stationary spacetime
Stationary state
Statistical ensemble (mathematical physics)
Statistical field theory
Statistical finance
Statistical mechanics
Statistical noise
Statistical physics
Statistical thermodynamics
Statistical weight
Steady State (Thermodynamics)
Steady State theory
Steady state
Steam devil
Stefan Bernhard
Stefan Hell
Stefan Marinov
Stefan Meyer (physicist)
Ștefan Procopiu
Stefan Rozental
Stefan problem
Stefan–Boltzmann constant
Stefan–Boltzmann law
Steinhart–Hart equation
Stellar birthline
Stellar black hole
Stellar drift
Stellar dynamics
Stellar evolution
Stellar kinematics
Stellar magnetic field
Stellar nucleosynthesis
Stellar pulsations
Stellarator
Step response
Stephan Herminghaus
Stephan von Molnár
Stephanie Wehner
Stephen Barr
Stephen Blundell
Stephen D. Levene
Stephen Gray (scientist)
Stephen H. Davis
Stephen Hawking
Stephen Hsu
Stephen L. Adler
Stephen Parke
Stephen Quake
Stephen Salter
Stephen Shenker
Stephen Thorndike
Stephen Thorsett
Stephen Wolfram
Steradian
Stereopsis
Stereoscopy
Sterile neutrino
Stern–Gerlach Medal
Stern–Gerlach experiment
Steven Chu
Steven E. Jones
Steven Frautschi
Steven Girvin
Steven Gubser
Steven Gwon Sheng Louie
Steven MacLean (astronaut)
Steven Orszag
Steven R. White
Steven Soter
Steven Weinberg
Stewart–Tolman effect
Sticking coefficient
Sticky bead argument
Stiction
Stiffness
Stilb (unit)
Stimulated emission
Sting jet
Stirling Colgate
Stirling cycle
Stirling engine
Stjepan Mohorovičić
Stochastic cooling
Stochastic electrodynamics
Stochastic interpretation
Stochastic resonance
Stochastic vacuum model
Stockbridge damper
Stoddard engine
Stokes' law
Stokes' law (sound attenuation)
Stokes' theorem
Stokes (unit)
Stokes Equations
Stokes boundary layer
Stokes drift
Stokes flow
Stokes number
Stokes operator
Stokes operators
Stokes parameters
Stokes relations
Stokes shift
Stokes stream function
Stokes wave
Stokesian dynamics
Stoletov's law
Stoletov curve
Stoner–Wohlfarth theory
Stoner–Wohlfarth astroid
Stoner–Wohlfarth model
Stoney units
Stopping and Range of Ions in Matter
Stopping power (particle radiation)
Storage ring
Storm surge
Strain energy density function
Strain energy release rate
Strain hardening exponent
Strain scanning
Strain tensor
Strange B meson
Strange matter
Strange quark
Strangelet
Strangeness
Strangeness production
Strange–Rahman–Smith equation
Strato of Lampsacus
Straw chamber
Straw tracker
Streak camera
Stream function
Stream thrust averaging
Streaming vibration current/potential
Streamline curvature theorem
Streamline diffusion
Streamlines, streaklines, and pathlines
Strength constant
Strength of materials
Stress (mechanics)
Stress concentration
Stress intensity factor
Stress measures
Stress relaxation
Stress–energy tensor
Stress–energy–momentum pseudotensor
Stretch rule
String-net
String-net liquid
String (physics)
String background
String cosmology
String duality
String frame and Einstein frame
String resonance
String theory
String theory landscape
Strominger's equations
Strong confinement limit
Strong gravity
Strong interaction
Strongly correlated quantum spin liquid
Strontium ruthenate
Strouhal number
Structural stability
Structure and Interpretation of Classical Mechanics
Structure constants
Structure factor
Structure formation
Structure of liquids and glasses
Structureless particle
Stuart Ballantine
Stuart Parkin
Stuart Thomas Butler
Stueckelberg action
Subatomic particle
Subatomic scale
Subcircuit board
Subcooled liquid
Subcooling
Subcritical reactor
Subharmonic
Subhelic arc
Subir Sachdev
Sublimation (Physics)
Sublimation (phase transition)
Subparhelic circle
Subrahmanyan Chandrasekhar
Subsonic and transonic wind tunnel
Subsonic flight
Substellar object
Substitution method
Subsun
Subsynchronous orbit
Subwavelength imaging
Subwavelength optics
Suction
Sudbury Neutrino Observatory
Sudden ionospheric disturbance
Sudestada
Suhas Patankar
Sulamith Goldhaber
Sultan Bashiruddin Mahmood
Sum-frequency generation
Sum-over-paths
Sum frequency generation spectroscopy
Sum rule in quantum mechanics
Sumio Iijima
Sun
Sun dog
Sun glitter
Sun photometer
Sun valve
Sundance Bilson-Thompson
Sunil Mukhi
Sunlight
Sunspot
Sunstone (medieval)
Sunyaev–Zel'dovich effect
Super-Kamiokande
Super-Poincaré algebra
Super-lens
Super-low frequency
SuperB
SuperGrid
Super Dual Auroral Radar Network
Super Large Hadron Collider
Super Proton Synchrotron
Super QCD
Super Virasoro algebra
Super black
Super high frequency
Super lens
Superatom
Supercavitation
Supercell (crystal)
Supercharge
Supercluster
Superconducting Super Collider
Superconducting coherence length
Superconducting magnet
Superconducting magnetic energy storage
Superconducting nanowire single-photon detector
Superconducting quantum computing
Superconducting radio frequency
Superconducting tunnel junction
Superconducting wire
Superconductivity
Superconductor Insulator Transition
Superconformal algebra
Supercontinuum
Supercooling
Supercritical airfoil
Supercritical flow
Supercritical fluid
Supercurrent
Superdeformation
Superdense carbon allotropes
Superdeterminism
Superdiamagnetism
Superdiffeomorphism
Superexchange
Superferromagnetism
Superficial X-rays
Superfield
Superflare
Superfluid film
Superfluid helium-4
Superfluid vacuum
Superghost
Superglass
Supergraph
Supergravity
Supergroup (physics)
Superheating
Superhydrophobe
Superinsulator
Superlattice
Superlens
Superlense
Superlenses
Superlubricity
Superluminal motion
Supermanifold
Supermassive black hole
Supermatrix
Supermatrix (supersymmetry)
Supermultiplet
Supernova
Supernova Early Warning System
Supernova nucleosynthesis
Supernova remnant
Superoperator
Superoscillation
Superparamagnetism
Superpartner
Superposition principle
Superpotential
Superprism
Superradiance
Superradiant laser
Supersaturation
Superseded scientific theories
Superselection
Superselection rule
Supersolid
Supersonic fracture
Supersonic speed
Supersonic wind tunnel
Superspace
Supersplit supersymmetry
Superstatistics
Superstring theory
Superstructure (condensed matter)
Supersymmetric gauge theory
Supersymmetric quantum mechanics
Supersymmetry
Supersymmetry algebra
Supersymmetry breaking
Supersymmetry breaking scale
Supersymmetry in quantum gravity
Supersymmetry nonrenormalization theorems
Supplee's paradox
Supplemento al Nuovo Cimento
Supralateral arc
Suprathreshold stochastic resonance
Sura Ionospheric Heating Facility
Suraj N. Gupta
Surely You're Joking, Mr. Feynman!
Surface-tension values
Surface Evolver
Surface Science Reports
Surface Water Simulation Modelling Programme
Surface X-ray Diffraction (SXRD)
Surface charge
Surface conductivity
Surface core level shift
Surface energy
Surface equivalence principle
Surface extended X-ray absorption fine structure
Surface force
Surface forces apparatus
Surface freezing
Surface gravity
Surface layer
Surface phenomenon
Surface phonon
Surface photovoltage
Surface plasmon
Surface plasmon polaritons
Surface plasmon resonance
Surface power density
Surface reconstruction
Surface science
Surface selection rule
Surface states
Surface tension
Surfatron
Survey meter
Susan Cooper (physicist)
Susan Houde-Walter
Susan Hough
Susceptance
Susceptor
Susskind–Hawking battle
Sustain
Sustained Spheromak Physics Experiment
Svante Arrhenius
Sven Kullander (physicist)
Sverdrup wave
Swami Jnanananda
Swampland (physics)
Swan band
Swapan Chattopadhyay
Sweep theory
Swell (ocean)
Swept wing
Swihart velocity
Swinging Atwood's machine
Swiss Light Source
Swiss roll (metamaterial)
Sydney Chapman (mathematician)
Sylvester James Gates
Sylvia Fedoruk
Sylwester Porowski
Symbol rate
Symbolic dynamics
Symmetry (disambiguation)
Symmetry (physics)
Sympathetic cooling
Sympathetic resonance
Symplectic integrator
Symplectomorphism
Synchrocyclotron
Synchronous coordinates
Synchronous frame
Synchronous orbit
Synchrophasotron
Synchrotron
Synchrotron Radiation Center
Synchrotron Radiation Source
Synchrotron X-ray tomographic microscopy
Synchrotron light source
Synchrotron radiation
Synergetics (Haken)
Synroc
Synthesis of precious metals
Synthetic Metals
Synthetic aperture sonar
Synthetic element
Synthetic jet
Synthetic schlieren
Syntropy (Software)
Syun-Ichi Akasofu
Szczepan Szczeniowski
Sándor Gaál
Sándor Szalay (physicist)
Sénarmont prism
Sérgio Mascarenhas de Oliveira
Søren Absalon Larsen
Søren H. H. Larsen

Indexes of physics articles